Dean Klafurić (born 26 July 1972) is a Croatian professional football manager, currently serving as head coach for Budapest Honvéd FC of the Hungarian first division.

Manager career 
Klafuric started to work as a coach in NK Udarnik in 2005. He accepted place of head coach of Croatia Women's national football team in 2009. In 2012 he was relieved from the coaching position.

In 2012 he started working with young teams in football school at GNK Dinamo Zagreb and had opportunity to spread his knowledge on 35. AEFCA-e congress in Zagreb which gathered many famous coaches.

On 22 April 2018 he took over the caretaker manager role in Legia Warsaw after Romeo Jozak got fired He won with the team the domestic cup and a domestic league title double. On 4 June 2018, he was appointed as the head coach of Legia Warsaw..He was sacked as Legia manager on 1 August 2018.

On 26 June 2019 Klafurić started to work as a manager in NK Hrvatski Dragovoljac. On 25 July 2019 after a change of the board, he released his contract.

Budapest Honvéd 
On 24 October 2022, he was appointed as the new coach of Nemzeti Bajnokság I club Budapest Honvéd FC. He debuted with a 1-0 defeat at the Bozsik Aréna against Fehérvár FC on 29 October 2022.

Honours
Legia Warsaw
 Ekstraklasa: 2017-18 
 Polish Cup: 2017-18

References

External links
 

1972 births
Living people
Sportspeople from Zagreb
Croatian football managers
Women's national association football team managers
HNK Gorica managers
Legia Warsaw managers
NK Hrvatski Dragovoljac managers
Ethnikos Achna FC managers
NK Slaven Belupo managers
Budapest Honvéd FC managers
Croatian Football League managers
Expatriate football managers in Poland
Croatian expatriate sportspeople in Poland
Expatriate football managers in Cyprus
Croatian expatriate sportspeople in Cyprus
Expatriate football managers in Hungary
Croatian expatriate sportspeople in Hungary
GNK Dinamo Zagreb non-playing staff
Al Nassr FC non-playing staff
Croatian expatriate sportspeople in Saudi Arabia